The French conquest of Morocco began in 1907 and continued until 1934. By the Treaty of Fez of 1912, France imposed a protectorate over Morocco and spent the next two decades taking control of the country.

Before the protectorate 
The French trans-Saharan railway, reaching Aïn Séfra by 1897, redirected the economic ties of Figuig from Fez to Oran. From 1900, French troops drove into the region. The conquest of the oasis of Touat led to the redrawing of the Algeria–Morocco border in 1901, and the lobby of French settlers in Algeria pressed the French government in Paris to colonize this region to link Algeria with Senegal. Under the command of Officer Hubert Lyautey, the French took Béchar in 1903, which Lyautey renamed "Colomb" to conceal its location from leadership in Paris. Following an attack on Governor-General of Algeria Charles Jonnart, French forces bombarded Qsar Zenaga in Figuig, which  described as a show of force "to demonstrate to the Moroccans the power and range of our cannons."

With the 1904 Entente Cordiale, the British Empire withdrew its support for the neutrality and independence of Morocco, and the 1906 Algeciras Conference formalized French preeminence in Morocco.

Press and public opinion 
Particularly after the Madrid Conference of 1880, the press in Morocco became a colonial battleground. From 1904, the French Legation in Tangier published Es-Saada, a daily arabophone newspaper to promote French interests and influence Moroccan public opinion, taking aim especially at Sufi resistance leaders such as Muhammad al-Kabir al-Kattani and Ma al-'Aynayn.

Occupation of Oujda 

In March 1907, French troops occupied Oujda after the assassination of Émile Mauchamp in Marrakesh.

Bombardment of Casablanca 

A western front was opened in August 1907 with the Bombardment of Casablanca. French forces then pushed into the Shawiya plain in what French historians call la pacification de la Chaouia.

Northern Campaign 
Following the allowance of its interests and recognition of its influence in northern Morocco through the 1904 Entente Cordiale, 1906 Algeciras Conference and 1907 Pact of Cartagena, Spain occupied Ras Kebdana, a town near the Moulouya River, in March 1908 and launched the Melillan and Kert campaigns against the Riffian tribes between 1909 and 1912. In June 1911, Spanish troops occupied Larache and Ksar el-Kebir.

Eastern Campaign 
By 1911, the French campaign from the east, through what is now the southwest of Algeria, had reached the Ziz River, 200 miles within the Moroccan border. This effectively put a large swath of the pre-Saharan area in the southeast of Morocco under French control.

Post-Treaty of Fes 
On 21 May 1911, France occupied the city of Fes at the behest of Sultan Abd al-Hafid, which led to the Agadir Crisis. On 30 March 1912, Sultan Abd al-Hafid signed the Treaty of Fes, formally ceding Moroccan sovereignty to France, transforming Morocco into a protectorate of France and sparking the 1912 Fez riots. Although the Sultan and the Makhzen had consented to the treaty, many regions remained in revolt and resisted the conquest until 1934, when Morocco was declared pacified.  To ensure their own safety, the French moved the court from Fes to Rabat, which has served as the capital ever since. The conquest of Morocco took over 22 years. In several regions, French authority was maintained by cooperation with local chiefs and not by military strength.

Fez intifada 

On 17 April 1912, Moroccan infantrymen mutinied in the French garrison in Fez. The Moroccans were unable to take the city and were defeated by a French relief force. In late May 1912, Moroccan forces unsuccessfully attacked the enhanced French garrison at Fez.

Battle of Sidi Bou Othman 

In the Battle of Sidi Bou Othman in 1912, the French defeated Ahmed al-Hiba and captured Marrakesh.

Zaian War 

The Zaian Confederation of Berber tribes in Morocco fought a war of opposition against the French between 1914 and 1921. Resident-General Louis-Hubert Lyautey sought to extend French influence eastwards through the Middle Atlas mountains towards French Algeria.  This was opposed by the Zaians, led by Mouha ou Hammou Zayani. The war began well for the French, who quickly took the key towns of Taza and Khenifra.  Despite the loss of their base at Khénifra, the Zaians inflicted heavy losses on the French.

With the outbreak of the First World War, France withdrew troops for service in Europe, and they lost more than 600 in the Battle of El Herri.  Over the following four years, the French retained most of their territory despite the Central Powers' intelligence and financial support to the Zaian Confederation and continual raids and skirmishes reducing scarce French manpower.

After the signing of the Armistice with Germany in November 1918, significant forces of tribesmen remained opposed to French rule. The French resumed their offensive in the Khenifra area in 1920, establishing a series of blockhouses to limit the Zaians' freedom of movement. They opened negotiations with Hammou's sons, persuading three of them,  along with many of their followers, to submit to French rule. A split in the Zaian Confederation between those who supported submission and those still opposed led to infighting and the death of Hammou in Spring 1921.  The French responded with a strong, three-pronged attack into the Middle Atlas that pacified the area.  Some tribesmen, led by Moha ou Said, fled to the High Atlas and continued a guerrilla war against the French well into the 1930s.

Rif War 

Sultan Yusef's reign, from 1912 to 1927, was turbulent and marked with frequent uprisings against Spain and France. The most serious of these was a Berber uprising in the Rif Mountains, led by Abd el-Krim, who managed to establish a republic in the Rif. Though this rebellion began in the Spanish-controlled area in the north, it reached the French-controlled area. A coalition of France and Spain finally defeated the rebels in 1926.

See also
 France–Morocco relations
 Franco-Moroccan War
 French conquest of Algeria
 French conquest of Tunisia
 Pact of Cartagena

Notes

References

Further reading

.
Conflicts in 1911
Conflicts in 1912
Wars involving France
Wars involving Morocco
France–Morocco military relations